Frank Xavier Altimari (September 4, 1928 – July 19, 1998) was a United States circuit judge of the United States Court of Appeals for the Second Circuit and previously was a United States District Judge of the United States District Court for the Eastern District of New York.

Education and career

Born in Queens, New York, Altimari attended St. Francis College in Brooklyn. He received a Bachelor of Laws from Brooklyn Law School in 1951. He served as an attorney in private practice in Jamaica, New York from 1951 to 1965. During this period, he also was a law professor at St. Francis College from 1954 to 1963, and served on the school board in Westbury, New York from 1963 to 1965.

State judicial service

Altimari's judicial career began when he was elected to the Nassau County District Court in 1965. After serving on that court for four years, he was elected to the Nassau County Court for a term beginning in 1970 and then as a justice of the New York State Supreme Court (the trial court of New York), on which he served from 1974 to 1982. He also again taught at St. Francis College from 1972 to 1973.

Federal judicial service

Altimari was nominated by President Ronald Reagan on November 23, 1982, to a seat on the United States District Court for the Eastern District of New York vacated by Judge Edward Raymond Neaher. He was confirmed by the United States Senate on December 10, 1982, and received his commission on December 10, 1982. His service terminated on December 23, 1985, due to his elevation to the Second Circuit.

Altimari was nominated by President Reagan on October 23, 1985, to a seat on the United States Court of Appeals for the Second Circuit vacated by Judge Ellsworth Van Graafeiland. He was confirmed by the Senate on December 16, 1985, and received his commission on December 17, 1985. He assumed senior status on January 1, 1996. His service terminated on July 19, 1998, due to his death of brain cancer in Old Westbury, New York.

References

Sources

External links

 NYT obituary

1928 births
1998 deaths
Deaths from brain cancer in the United States
St. Francis College alumni
Brooklyn Law School alumni
New York (state) state court judges
Judges of the United States Court of Appeals for the Second Circuit
Judges of the United States District Court for the Eastern District of New York
United States court of appeals judges appointed by Ronald Reagan
United States district court judges appointed by Ronald Reagan
20th-century American judges
Lawyers from Queens, New York
People from Westbury, New York
20th-century American lawyers
American people of Italian descent